A civilian is a person who is not a member of his or her country's armed forces.

Civilian(s) or The Civilian(s) may also refer to:

Law
 A specialist in Roman law
 A specialist in modern civil law
 A member of the College of Civilians
 A member of the Indian Civil Service in British India

Music
 Civilian (Boy Kill Boy album), 2006
 Civilian (Gentle Giant album), 1980
 Civilian (Wye Oak album) or the title song, 2011
 Civilian, an album by Adam Pascal, 2004
 Civilian, an album by Frank Tovey, 1988
 Civilians (Joe Henry album) or the title song, 2007

Other uses
 Civilian (street artist), Australian street artist
 The Civilian, a New Zealand satirical website
 The Civilians, an investigative theatre company in New York City
 Nissan Civilian, a light bus

See also